Kutu is a Bantu language of the Morogoro region of Tanzania.

References

Languages of Tanzania
Northeast Coast Bantu languages